Maryam may refer to:
 Maryam Castle, a castle in Kermanshah Province, Iran
 Maryam (name), a feminine given name (the Aramaic and Arabic form of Miriam, Mary)
 Mary in Islam
 Maryam (surah), 19th sura of the Qur'an
 Maryam, Iran, a village in East Azerbaijan Province, Iran
 85471 Maryam, an asteroid
 Maryam (1953 film), a 1953 Iranian film
 Maryam (2002 film), a 2002 film about a young Iranian immigrant living in the US during the Iran hostage crisis
 Maryam (TV series), Pakistani drama aired on Geo TV network
 Kanaya and Porrim Maryam, characters from the webcomic Homestuck

See also
 Mosque Maryam, a large mosque in Chicago, Illinois, and headquarters of the Nation of Islam religious movement
 Miriam (disambiguation)
 Mariam (disambiguation)